David Schumacher (30 November 1931 – 15 January 2022) was an Australian wrestler. He competed in the men's freestyle lightweight at the 1956 Summer Olympics. Schumacher died on 15 January 2022, at the age of 90.

References

External links
 

1931 births
2022 deaths
Place of birth missing
Australian male sport wrestlers
Olympic wrestlers of Australia
Wrestlers at the 1956 Summer Olympics